Bernard Lewis (31 May 1916 – 19 May 2018) was a British-American historian, public intellectual, and political commentator. Lewis' expertise was in the history of Islam and the interaction between Islam and the West.

His advice was frequently sought by policymakers, including the Bush administration. Lewis wrote dozens of books, lectures, and essays.

Books by Lewis

Films

References

External links
 

Books by Bernard Lewis
Bibliographies by writer
Bibliographies of American writers
Philosophy bibliographies